Anglo Urdu Boys' High School, Pune, India, is one of the oldest Urdu- and English-language schools in the city. The school is affiliated to the Maharashtra State Board of Secondary and Higher Secondary Board (MSBSHSE). The school is located in Azam campus, a part of the Camp area of the city.

History 
Anglo Urdu Boys' High School was established in 1920. In 1927, the school was shifted to its present building constructed on a part of the 23 acres of land bought by the great business tycoon and The so-called king of sugar in the then sugar industry Haji Gulam Mohd Azam Alloo of village Rander, Surat, Gujarat . Prior to independence of India, the school was run by the British Raj government. Thereafter, the government grant was discontinued and the Maharashtra Cosmopolitan Society (MCE) took over the school and had to depend entirely on the small amounts of donation it received from its patrons, from old boys and from members of the society. The government grant was restored in 1972.

Initially, the school had Urdu language classes and the young men of the community were deprived knowledge of English. This prompted the management to start English medium classes from Standard V to X in 1971. Now, the school has a junior college and students can complete their education up to Standard XII in any of the three disciplines of Arts, Commerce and Science, before they proceed to receive higher education in degree colleges. Nearly 1750 students of different castes and communities receive education through English as the medium of instruction.

Campus 
The school building is located on the Azam campus, spread over 23 acres, in the Pune Cantonment known as Camp. It also consist of 29 other institutes. The school has a library, computer and science labs. Physical training is compulsory for all the students of the Jr.College. They are required to attend 75% of P.T.and parade arranged for them by the college.

See also 
List of schools in Pune

References

External links 

High schools and secondary schools in Maharashtra
Schools in Pune
1920 establishments in India
Educational institutions established in 1920
Schools in Colonial India